The Killing is a Danish police procedural drama television series created by Søren Sveistrup and produced by DR in co-production with ZDF Enterprises. It premiered on the Danish national television channel DR1 on 7 January 2007, and has since been broadcast in several other countries.

The series is set in Copenhagen and revolves around Detective Inspector Sarah Lund (Sofie Gråbøl). Each series follows a murder case day-by-day. Each fifty-minute episode covers twenty-four hours of the investigation. The series is noted for its plot twists, season-long storylines, dark tone and for giving equal emphasis to the stories of the murdered victim's family and the effect in political circles alongside the police investigation. It has also been singled out for the photography of its Danish setting, and for the acting ability of its cast.

The Killing has proved to be an international success, particularly in the United Kingdom, Germany and the Netherlands, receiving numerous awards and nominations including a BAFTA Award and an International Emmy. It has become something of a cult show. Novelisations of each series have been published by Macmillan.

Production

Development
Søren Sveistrup, series creator and head writer, worked closely with lead actress Sofie Gråbøl throughout the writing process to develop the character of Detective Inspector Sarah Lund. Gråbøl, in particular, became eager to defend her character. Gråbøl had a history of playing emotionally demonstrative characters on Danish televisionshe had worked with Sveistrup before on the TV-series Nikolaj og Juliehe approached her direct to play the part of Lund before work on the script began.

Filming
Despite her insistence that she wanted to play an "isolated person [who is] unable to communicate" Gråbøl initially found it difficult to strike the right balance for the emotionally-distant Lund and then realised that the only people she knew, who were like the character, were men. As a result, she began "acting like a man" until the character took shape.

During filming of the first series, Sveistrup also refused to reveal the identity of the murderer or even specific plot points to members of the cast, including Gråbøl. The actors would receive the scripts only on an episode-by-episode basis just moments before shooting was scheduled to begin. Only Gråbøl was told that she was not the killer.

Series 1

The first series consists of twenty fifty-minute episodes, which follow the police investigation into the murder of a young woman from its commencement on 3 November to its conclusion on 22 November.

The first ten episodes were shown on DR1 each Sunday from early January to the middle of March 2007 and the intention was to show the remaining ten episodes in January–March 2008; it was so popular in Denmark that in early March it was announced that the final ten episodes would be brought forward to the autumn of 2007; they were shown from late September to late November 2007.

Synopsis

Main cast

 Inspector Sarah Lund: Sofie Gråbøl
 Inspector Jan Meyer: Søren Malling
 Chief Inspector Erik Buchard: Troels II Munk (episodes 1–11) 
 Chief Inspector Lennart Brix: Morten Suurballe (episodes 11–20)
 Troels Hartmann: Lars Mikkelsen
 Mayor Poul Bremer: Bent Mejding
 Rie Skovgaard: Marie Askehave
 Theis Birk Larsen: Bjarne Henriksen
 Pernille Birk Larsen: Ann Eleonora Jørgensen
 Vagn Skærbæk: Nicolaj Kopernikus
 Rama: Farshad Kholghi
 Morten Weber: Michael Moritzen
 Nanna Birk Larsen: Julie Ølgaard

Episodes and ratings

Series 2
Forbrydelsen II is set two years later and consists of ten episodes. It aired in Denmark between 27 September and 29 November 2009. Episodes were screened eleven days later on Thursdays on Norwegian NRK1. It was shown on German TV channel ZDF and on Swedish SVT in the autumn of 2010. In the United Kingdom, it was shown on BBC Four, starting from 19 November 2011, following the success of the first series, on the Belgian channel, Canvas, starting on 25 November 2011, and in Australia on SBS Two, starting from 21 March 2012. The Region 2 DVD with English subtitles was released on 19 December 2011.

Plot
Inspector Ulrik Strange arrives at a port where Lund is working as a border guard, on the orders of her former boss, Brix, to ask her to return to help investigate the murder of Anne Dragsholm, a military adviser found murdered in Ryvangen Memorial Park. Lund suspects that the murder is not as straightforward as it seems, despite the forced confession of Dragsholm's husband. Meanwhile, Thomas Buch, the newly appointed Minister of Justice, suspects that his predecessor was involved in the cover-up of a massacre of Afghan civilians by Danish soldiers and that this incident is connected with the murder. Lund is about to be discharged from the case when a second killing, that of a Danish military veteran, leads to fears that Islamic extremists are involved. Jens Peter Raben, a sectioned war veteran, knew both victims and tells his story of the execution of an Afghan family by a special forces officer named "Perk". Raben escapes, and two other members of the unit are murdered. Suspicion falls on senior military officers, including Raben's father-in-law, Colonel Jarnvig.

Buch and his secretarial team uncover further evidence of the cover-up, but the cabinet pressures him to continue pinning the murders on Muslims in order to assure the passage of an anti-terrorism bill. Raben takes refuge in a church presided over by a former army chaplain, who tries to convince him to give himself up and stop investigating the killings. Lund discovers the chaplain's body and pursues the perpetrator. She arranges for the exhumation of Perk's body. When Lund and Strange catch up with Raben, he calls out Perk's name before Strange shoots him. An injured Raben persists in accusing Strange of being the officer responsible for the massacre, yet it is later officially confirmed that he had left Afghanistan before the killings. Lund is uneasy about Strange's alibis for the murders, but takes him with her to Afghanistan to investigate a new suspect. Lund's persistence results in the discovery of the bones of the Afghan civilians.

Upon returning to Denmark, Lund meets her mother, who has had a premonition of Lund lying dead. Following a further search of a military barracks, suspicion falls on Captain Bilal, an anti-Taliban Muslim who kidnaps Raben's wife Louise. Raben and Jarnvig lead Lund and Strange to Bilal, who is killed by an explosion before they are able to question him. Strange volunteers to return Raben to the mental hospital, but Lund insists on driving them. On the way, they make a stop at the scene of Dragsholm's murder, where Lund points out to Strange the reasons why Bilal is unlikely to have been involved. Strange reveals a detail that only the murderer could know, and confesses to the murders before shooting Lund with her own gun, which he then plants on Raben. He phones the police and is about to shoot Raben when Lund hits him over the head. When Strange tries to retrieve his gun, Lund shoots him dead. As the police arrive at the scene, Lund walks away, removing her bullet-proof vest.

Main cast

 Inspector Sarah Lund: Sofie Gråbøl
 Chief Inspector Lennart Brix: Morten Suurballe
 Inspector Ulrik Strange: Mikael Birkkjær
 Justice Minister Thomas Buch: Nicolas Bro
 Prime Minister Gert Grue Eriksen: Kurt Ravn
 Colonel Torsten Jarnvig: Flemming Enevold
 Major Christian Søgaard: Carsten Bjørnlund
 Sergeant Jens Peter Raben: Ken Vedsegaard
 Louise Raben: Stine Prætorius
 Carsten Plough: Preben Kristensen
 Karina Munk Jørgensen: Charlotte Guldberg
 Erling Krabbe: Jens Jacob Tychsen
 Captain Said Bilal: Igor Radoslavjevic
 VPD Ruth Hedeby: Lotte Andersen

Episodes and ratings

Series 3 
Forbrydelsen III, premiered on Danish television on 23 September 2012.  It commenced on NRK1 in Norway on Monday 8 October 2012, with an audience of 436,000.

Series 3 on BBC Four in the UK began on 17 November 2012 with 1.04 million viewers.

Short summary
This final ten-part series begins with the murder of a sailor. Sarah Lund's investigation turns to the financial and governmental communities during the global financial crisis.

Main cast

 Chief Inspector Sarah Lund: Sofie Gråbøl
 VPD  Lennart Brix: Morten Suurballe
 Mathias Borch: Nikolaj Lie Kaas
 Inspector Asbjørn Juncker: Sigurd Holmen le Dous
 Robert Zeuthen: Anders W. Berthelsen
 Maja Zeuthen: Helle Fagralid
 Niels Reinhardt: Stig Hoffmeyer
 Prime Minister Kristian Kamper: Olaf Johannessen
 Kristoffer "Stoffer" Kamper: Jonatan Spang
 Karen Nebel: Trine Pallesen
 Birgit Eggert: Tammi Øst
 Deputy Public Prosecutor Tage Steiner: Peter Mygind
 Rosa Lebech: Sara-Marie Maltha

Episodes and ratings

Figures for the UK broadcast of episodes 1 – 8 do not include the ratings for BBC HD.

Overseas success
In the wake of the successful Wallander series, The Killing became another Scandinavian crime hit with British viewers when it was shown on BBC Four in the spring of 2011. Although subtitled, it attracted more viewers than Mad Men, scored audience appreciation figures of 94%, and was described as "the best series currently on TV". The success created an interest in all things Danish, and the female detective's Faroese jumper was the subject of newspaper articles as well as becoming a sought after online item.

As well as the UK, DR also sold the series to a number of other broadcasters worldwide, and The Killing was eventually shown in Australia, Austria, Belgium, Brazil, Canada, Germany, Japan, Russia, Spain and the US with varying degrees of success. Producer Piv Bernth described the broad appeal of the show as "groundbreaking", and explained what she believed to be the root of its popularity: "It's the first time you have a detective drama over 20 episodes – other series had one killing per episode. And we also have this three-plot structure – what does it [a murder] mean for a police investigator, what does it mean for the parents, what does it mean for the politicians. It's not just about finding the murderer. That's important, but it's not all."

Over 120 countries have purchased the first two seasons of The Killing. The first series has also been shown in other countries, as follows:

 2007: Norway on NRK1 (as Forbrytelsen)
 2007: Finland on Yle Fem (as Brottet) and AVA (as Rikos)
 2007: Faroe Islands on SvF (as Brotsgerðin)
 2008: Sweden on SVT1 (as Brottet)
 2008: Iceland on RÚV
 2008: Germany on ZDF (as Kommissarin Lund: Das Verbrechen)
 2009: Austria on ORF
 2010: Belgium, France, Germany on ARTE (as The Killing)
 2010: Australia on SBS One
 2010: Belgium on Canvas
 2011: United Kingdom on BBC Four (as The Killing)
 2011: Russia on Channel One (as Убийство)
 2011: Spain on AXN (as The Killing: Crónica de un asesinato)
 2011: Portugal on AXN Black (as The Killing: Crónica de um assassinato)
 2011: Poland on Ale Kino+ (as The Killing)
 2012: Japan on Super! drama TV (as The Killing)
 2012: Brazil on Globosat HD (as The Killing: História de Um Assassinato)
 2012: Netherlands on Nederland 2 by the KRO (as The Killing)
 2012:  Hungary
 2012: New Zealand on SoHo TV (as Forbrydelsen)
 2012: Belgium, France, Germany on ARTE (as The Killing)
 2012: Italy on RAI4 (as Killing)
 2012: Croatia on HRT3 (as Ubojstvo)
 2013: Estonia on ETV (as Kuritegu)
 2013: Czech Republic on ČT2 (as Zločin)
 2013: Greece on Mega Channel (as The Killing)
 2013: Turkey on Dizimax (as Forbrydelsen)
 2013: Serbia on RTS1 (as Ubistvo)
 2013: Taiwan on PTS (as The Killing)
 2013: Latin America on AXN Central & South America (as The Killing: Crónica de un asesinato)
 2013: Republic of Ireland on TG4 (as The Killing)
 2014: Iran, Afghanistan, Tajikistan on BBC Persian (as Ghatl dar Kopenhag [Murder in Copenhagen])
 2015: Slovenia on TV3 Medias (as  Investigation)
 2020: Canada on Knowledge Network (as The Killing)
 2021: Israel on Kan 11 (as The Murder)
 2021: The USA on Amazon Prime (as The Killing)

Awards and nominations
The Killing has been awarded a number of awards and recognitions from various festivals and organisations from around the globe since it began in 2007. Because of the time-lapse in airdates between countries, honours awarded to the first two series are spread out over an unusual number of years.

In the UK, the first series won the 2011 BAFTA award in the "Best International" category. It was also nominated for the Audience Award but lost to reality show The Only Way is Essex. The second series was again nominated for "Best International" in 2012, but lost out to fellow Danish programme Borgen.

Subtitled programmes in the UK
Following both its critical and ratings success in the United Kingdom, the BBC began importing and broadcasting more subtitled programmes from a number of different countries. In 2012 the popular Danish drama Borgen and the more popular joint Swedish-Danish venture The Bridge both aired on BBC Four with similarly high viewing figures, while in the same year ITV3 also acquired the original TV2 series Those Who Kill. In late 2011 digital channel Sky Arts also broadcast the Italian series Romanzo Criminale, while FX bought the rights to popular French cop show Braquo.

Although BBC Four had shown subtitled dramas before, notably the Swedish version of Wallander and French police procedural Spiral, controller of the channel Richard Klein described The Killing as "a game-changer". Vicky Frost of The Guardian noted how it was The Killing which "paved the way for a wave of subtitled European crime dramas" appearing on UK television, while head of programming at FX Toby Etheridge also confirmed his belief that "The Killing proved it was possible [to successfully show subtitled drama]".

Remakes

In 2011, a US remake was produced by the American cable network AMC. The original series was not broadcast in the US. A remake was produced by Fox Television Studios for the American cable network AMC. It premiered on 3 April 2011 and ran for two seasons before being cancelled on 27 July 2012. However, on 8 November 2012, it was confirmed that Fox Television Studios were in final negotiations with Netflix in order to continue the series for a third season. AMC, who had originally cancelled the show, was also included in part of the deal. The deal in question gives the network the privilege of airing the new episodes before they are hosted by Netflix in return for sharing any associated production costs with Netflix.  The original US production team are expected to return. A fourth season, consisting of six episodes, was produced by and is available on Netflix.

On 8 April 2011, Sofie Gråbøl, the star of the Danish series, was interviewed on the BBC Radio 4 programme Woman's Hour when she explained the American remake was necessary because Americans "for some reason cannot read subtitles, or they don't want to". Gråbøl herself has made a guest appearance in one episode of the American show playing a minor role.

A Turkish remake, Cinayet, was produced by Adam Film for Kanal D, premiering 7 January 2014.  Despite being ordered for 13 episodes, it was cancelled after 5 due to low ratings.

A Egyptian remake, Mounatef Khater was produced, the rights were previously acquired by MBC and Charisma Group.

Novelisations
A novelisation based on the first series and titled The Killing: Book One was published by Macmillan in 2012. The book was written by British author David Hewson. This was followed by The Killing: Book Two in January 2013, and  The Killing: Book Three in February 2014.

See also 
 Danish television drama
 Scandinavian noir

References

External links
 
 
 

2007 Danish television series debuts
2012 Danish television series endings
2000s Danish television series
2010s Danish television series
DR television dramas
Danish crime television series
Danish drama television series
BAFTA winners (television series)
Television shows set in Denmark
Danish-language television shows